Chess is a 2006 Indian Malayalam-language revenge action thriller film directed by Raj Babu. Dileep plays the male protagonist and Bhavana is his heroine. The film also stars Ashish Vidyarthi, Jagathy Sreekumar, Harisree Ashokan and Vijayaraghavan and Rajyalakshmi.

The movie was dubbed into Hindi as Aag Ka Dariya. This is one of the very few movies which has a linearly dubbed version.

Plot
Vijayakrishnan is an ordinary boy who longs for his father's love. After his father's premeditated death, as the only heir to all his father's property, he is betrayed by his trusted lawyer who confirms his documents as fake. The people who are after Vijayakrishnan's father's wealth, murders his mother in front of him by dousing her with gasoline and burning her. Vijayakrishnan is then beaten unconscious by them. To get his revenge on the criminals that killed his parents and discredited him from his wealth, Vijayakrishnan pretends to be blind and deceives them, one by one. The incident happened after that shapes the rest of the film.

Cast

Soundtrack

The movie features a soundtrack composed by Berny Ignatius and lyrics written by Vayalar Sarathchandra Varma

Reception
Paresh C Palicha from Rediff , says that "Dileep. With Chess, he has brought in a seriousness to his brand of filmmaking, the only grouse being that there should been a tighter script to support him. Bhavana, as the love interest, has some significance in the beginning, but it is totally lost by the end of the film. Salim Kumar and Harisree Asokan handle the comic department proficiently. Ashish Vidyarthi, Vijayraghavan, Bheeman Raghu and Babu Raj play typical villains without too much of a fuss" Sify.com wrote that "It is an out and out Dileep film. He is there in almost all frames and makes the film work. He has been successful in shedding his comedy image and tries a serious revenge drama. So if you are game to watch a film that?s different from the usual Dileep entertainers, try out Chess. It is a deep, dark tale of revenge, with a unique ending"
 A critic from The Hindu said that "Rajbabu, director, has presented a thriller with no suspense. All the moves made by the hero are predictable".

References

External links 
 
 

2000s Malayalam-language films
Films scored by Berny–Ignatius